Georges Leekens (born 18 May 1949) is a Belgian football manager and former player. During his managerial career, he was in charge of four national teams: the Belgian, Tunisian, Algerian and Hungarian national football teams. He also managed numerous clubs in Belgium, the Netherlands, Turkey, Tunisia, Iran and Saudi Arabia.

Playing career
Leekens made his debut as a footballer in 1967 with Sporting Houthalen after leaving the lower ranks of the club. In 1969, he signed for one year with KFC Dessel Sport. After a brief stint at Crossing Club, he was transferred to Club Brugge. With the team, he reached the final of the UEFA Champions League in 1978 against Liverpool in Wembley Stadium in London where they were defeated with a single goal. He also won five Belgian leagues, a Belgian Cup and a Belgian Super Cup in 1980, one year before joining the Sint-Niklase in which he retired from football in 1984.

Coaching career

Beginning
The same year of his retirement, Cercle Brugge signed him as coach for the next three seasons, eventually winning the Belgian Cup a year later. The same title won with RSC Anderlecht three years after winning it with the Cercle Brugge. After training KV Kortrijk, he came to Club Brugge to win the Belgian League, the Belgian Super Cup in 1990, the Belgian Cup and again the Belgian Super Cup in 1991. He also trained the KV Mechelen, Trabzonspor.  Back to the Cercle Brugge and Royal Charleroi before signing for the RE Mouscron, who was promoted to the Belgian First Division after finishing first in the Belgian Second Division.

First spell in Belgium
In his first spell as coach of the Belgium national team he led them to the 1998 FIFA World Cup finals after a two-legged win against the Republic of Ireland in the qualifying play-off. He was sacked from his role as federal coach after a disappointing third place finish in the World Cup group stage after failing to qualify Belgium for the second round after drawing with Netherlands, Mexico and South Korea.

Algeria
After making a brief pass as coach of KSC Lokern and Roda JC, he was announced as coach of Algeria at the end of 2002, which he qualified for the 2004 African Cup of Nations in Tunisia, but reached an agreement with the Federation to rescind the contract for family reasons.

Back to Belgium and a short experience in the Persian Gulf
After his African stage, he returned to the Royal Excelsior Mouscron, then he signed for KAA Gent for three years and again he would take the bench of KSC Lokeren. In 2009, it was announced that he would be the new coach of Al-Hilal FC but he was sacked after three months after being defeated against Al-Shabab 3–0 so he coached KV Kortrijk again for one season.

Second spell in Belgium
On 11 May 2010, Leekens signed a contract until 2012 to take over the Belgium national team for the second time. As a consequence he had to resign from his coaching role at K.V. Kortrijk.

On 12 April 2011, it was announced that Leekens's contract had been extended to 2014 after some promising results in the Euro 2012 qualifying campaign.

On 13 May 2012, it was announced that Leekens would coach Club Brugge for a second time, but he was fired a few months later after a series of successive defeats.

Tunisia
On 27 March 2014, Leekens signed a two-year contract with the Tunisian Football Federation to coach the Carthage Eagles. For his first tournament with Tunisia, Georges Leekens managed to take the team to the quarterfinals, his team being eliminated 2–1 by Equatorial Guinea, the host country of the 2015 Africa Cup of Nations. On 27 June 2015, the Tunisian federation announced having terminated its contract amicably.

Return to Algeria
In 2016, he coached the Algerian national football team, and he made the team to the 2017 Africa Cup of Nations in Gabon. On 24 January 2017, he resigned being a coach after being eliminated in Group B stage.

In February 2017 he was one of a number of managers on the shortlist for the vacant Rwanda national team manager role.

Hungary
In October 2017 it was announced, that Leekens would coach the Hungary national team. After three losses and one draw in four matches, he was fired in June 2018.

Experience in African and Asian clubs
He was appointed by Tunisian club Étoile du Sahel as coach on 10 October 2018 after failing in the 2018 CAF Champions League to be his first experience with African clubs after a long period in European clubs and a short experience in Asian clubs with Al Hilal. He managed to qualify the team to the quarter-finals of the Arab Championship with African champions Wydad Casablanca before leaving on 26 November for unconvincing results in the Tunisian League.

After less than two months in January 2019, Leekens contracted with Tractor of Iran, but his coaching period did not last long, as the contract was rescinded in May 2019.

In May 2020, nearly a year after his last coaching experience, Leekens announced his retirement, to devote himself to his own affairs.

Personal life
Georges Leekens is the cousin of Louis Leekens, who was Belgian National Champion of gymnastics in 1966 and is leading the top sports school for gymnastics in Genk.

Managerial statistics

Managerial record

Honours

As player 
Club Brugge Belgian First Division: 1972–73, 1975–76, 1976–77, 1977–78, 1979–80
 Belgian Cup: 1976–77; 1978–79 (finalists) 
 Belgian Super Cup: 1980
 UEFA Cup: 1975–76
 European Champion Clubs' Cup: 1977–78
Jules Pappaert Cup: 1972, 1978Bruges Matins: 1979, 1981 Japan Cup Kirin World Soccer: 1981 As manager Anderlecht Belgian Super Cup: 1987Club Brugge Belgian First Division: 1989–90
 Belgian Cup: 1990–91
 Belgian Super Cup: 1990
 Amsterdam Tournament: 1990Cercle Brugge
 Belgian Cup: 1985

Belgium
 Kirin Cup: 1999

Individual 
 Belgian Professional Manager of the Year: 1989–90

References

External links

 
 

1949 births
1998 FIFA World Cup managers
Belgian football managers
Belgian footballers
Belgium international footballers
Cercle Brugge K.S.V. managers
Club Brugge KV head coaches
Club Brugge KV players
K.A.A. Gent managers
K.S.C. Lokeren Oost-Vlaanderen managers
Living people
Trabzonspor managers
R. Charleroi S.C. managers
Royal Excel Mouscron managers
R.S.C. Anderlecht managers
Roda JC Kerkrade managers
Belgian Pro League players
Belgium national football team managers
K.V. Kortrijk managers
Al Hilal SFC managers
Algeria national football team managers
Belgian expatriate football managers
Expatriate football managers in Algeria
Expatriate football managers in Turkey
Expatriate football managers in Tunisia
K.V. Mechelen managers
K.V.V. Crossing Elewijt players
Tunisia national football team managers
People from Meeuwen-Gruitrode
2015 Africa Cup of Nations managers
2017 Africa Cup of Nations managers
Association football defenders
Belgian expatriate sportspeople in Algeria
Belgian expatriate sportspeople in Turkey
Belgian expatriate sportspeople in Tunisia
Hungary national football team managers
Expatriate football managers in Hungary
Belgian expatriate sportspeople in Hungary
K. Sint-Niklase S.K.E. players
Étoile Sportive du Sahel managers
Tractor S.C. managers
Expatriate football managers in Iran
Belgian expatriate sportspeople in Saudi Arabia
Expatriate football managers in Saudi Arabia
Saudi Professional League managers
Footballers from Limburg (Belgium)
Persian Gulf Pro League managers